Roman Davyskiba (born 31 March 2001) is a Belarusian professional footballer who plays for  Dinamo Minsk.

Honours
Shakhtyor Soligorsk
Belarusian Premier League champion: 2022

References

External links 
 
 

2001 births
Living people
People from Zhlobin District
Sportspeople from Gomel Region
Belarusian footballers
Association football midfielders
FC Dinamo Minsk players
FC Shakhtyor Soligorsk players